Iredalea theoteles is a species of sea snail, a marine gastropod mollusk in the family Drilliidae.

Description
The length of the shell is about 3.5 mm, and its diameter is about 1.75 mm.

This very small shell has some slight resemblance to Mangilia thepalea Melvill & Standen, 1896 (a taxon inquirendum). The nodulous papillae are, however, much larger in proportion to the size of the shell, and, in consequence, fewer. The upper whorls are closely tubercled, shining white. The four rows—two on the penultimate, two on the last whorl—are approximate, and the space contained by them is banded with ochre, the white shining nodules standing out more prominently. The aperture is narrow and oblong. The anal sinus is deep. The outer lip is much thickened, four toothed within as is the columellar margin.

Distribution
This marine species occurs off the Loyalty Islands and is rare.

References

  Tucker, J.K. 2004 Catalog of recent and fossil turrids (Mollusca: Gastropoda). Zootaxa 682:1–1295

External links
 

theoteles
Gastropods described in 1896